Arvid Nyberg (19 May 1928 – 18 January 2022) was a Norwegian politician for the Labour Party.

Life and career
Nyberg was born on 19 May 1928. He served as a deputy representative to the Parliament of Norway from Hedmark during the terms 1973–1977, 1977–1981 and 1981–1985. In total he met during 92 days of parliamentary session. On the local level, Nyberg was the mayor of Trysil from 1972 to 1999. At that time he was the longest-serving mayor in Norway. He was since surpassed by Henning Myrvang, who was mayor of Sør-Odal from 1975 to 2007. Nybergdied on 18 January 2022, at the age of 93.

References

1928 births
2022 deaths
People from Trysil
Deputy members of the Storting
Labour Party (Norway) politicians
Mayors of places in Hedmark